Cepora judith, the Orange Gull, is a butterfly of the family Pieridae. It has no common name, although a subspecies is referred to as the orange gull. It is found in south-eastern Asia (see subspecies section).

The larvae feed on Capparis species.

Subspecies
C. j. judith (Java)
C. j. lea (Doubleday, 1846) (southern Burma)
C. j. malaya (Fruhstorfer, 1899) (Peninsular Malaysia, Langkawi, Singapore)
C. j. siamensis (Butler, 1899) (Thailand, Pulau Aur)
C. j. talboti Corbet, 1937 (Pulau Tioman)
C. j. amalia Vollenhoven, 1865 (Sumatra)
C. j. montana Fruhstorfer, 1899 (northern Borneo)
C. j. meridionalis Fruhstorfer, 1899 (south-eastern Borneo)
C. j. hespera Butler, 1899 (Sarawak, Labuan)
C. j. natuna Fruhstorfer, 1899 (Natuna Islands)
C. j. selma Weymer, 1885 (Nias)
C. j. ethel (Doherty, 1891) (Enggano)
C. j. naomi Wallace, 1867 (Lombok)
C. j. aga Fruhstorfer, 1902 (Sumbawa)
C. j. oberthueri Röber, 1892 (Flores)
C. j. eirene Doherty, 1891 (Sumba)
C. j. olga (Eschscholtz, 1821) (the Philippines)
C. j. anaitis Fruhstorfer, 1910 (north-western Luzon)
C. j. rhemia Fruhstorfer, 1910 (Mindoro, Negros, Bohol)
C. j. poetelia Fruhstorfer, 1910 (Cebu)
C. j. orantia Fruhstorfer, 1910 (Mindanao)
C. j. olgina Staudinger, 1889 (Palawan)
C. j. zisca Fruhstorfer, 1899 (Basilan)
C. j. irma Fruhstorfer, 1910 (Jolo)
C. j. phokaia Fruhstorfer, 1910 (Balabac)
C. j. jael (Wallace, 1867) (Buru, Ambon, Serang)
?C. j. emma Vollenhoven, 1865 (Morotai, Halmahera, Ternate, Bachan)
?C. j. aspasina Fruhstorfer, 1904 (Obi)
?C. j. hester Vollenhoven, 1865 (Waigeu)

Both Cepora aspasia and Cepora ethel are treated as a full species by some authors.

External links
C. j. lea info

Pierini
Butterflies of Borneo
Butterflies of Indochina
Butterflies described in 1787